Club Deportivo, Social y Cultural Gasparín, also known as «Gasparín F.C.», is a Chilean football club based in the city of El Bosque. They currently play at the fourth level of Chilean football, the Third Division A of Chile.

History 
The club was founded on July 27, 2012 in Santiago of Chile as Nueva Juventud San Ramón in the city of San Ramón.

In the year 2014, the chairman decided to change the club's name to Club Deportivo, Social y Cultural Gasparín.

At that very year, the Gasparín FC got the promotion following a 2-1 win against Pudahuel Barrancas.

Stadium 
The stadium of Club Deportivo, Social y Cultural Gasparín, is the Stadium Municipal of Lo Blanco.

 Direction: Street Lo Blanco 550, El Bosque, Santiago, Chile.
 Capacity: 1 000.

Coach 
  Tulio Pinilla Peña (2019)
  Manuel Rodríguez Garrido (2019)

Seasons 
 3 seasons in Third Division A of Chile.
 3 seasons in Third Division B of Chile.
 2 participation in Absolute Cup of Chile.

Statistics 
 Biggest win in favor
 Gasparín FC 6 - 0 Deportes Pirque, in the year 2016.
 Biggest win against
 Provincial Marga Marga 10 - 0 Gasparín FC, in the year 2012.

Performance

League

Cup

References

External links 
Social networks of Gasparín Football Club.
 Gasparín FC in Facebook. 
 Gasparín FC in Twitter. 

2012 establishments in Chile
Association football clubs established in 2012
Football clubs in Chile